was a Japanese era or nengō which was promulgated by the more militarily powerful of two Imperial rival courts during the . This  nengō came after Kōei and before Kannō and lasting from October 1345 through February 1350.

Nanboku-chō overview
   
During the Meiji period, an Imperial decree dated March 3, 1911, established that the legitimate reigning monarchs of this period were the direct descendants of Emperor Go-Daigo through Emperor Go-Murakami, whose  had been established in exile in Yoshino, near Nara.

Until the end of the Edo period, the militarily superior pretender-Emperors supported by the Ashikaga shogunate had been mistakenly incorporated in Imperial chronologies despite the undisputed fact that the Imperial Regalia were not in their possession.

This illegitimate  had been established in Kyoto by Ashikaga Takauji.

Change of era
 1345, also called : The new era name was created to mark an event or series of events. The previous era ended and the new one commenced in Kōei 2.

In this time frame, Kōkoku (1340-1346) and Shōhei (1346-1370) were Southern Court equivalent nengō.

Events of the Jōwa era 
 1346 (Jōwa 2, 2nd month): The kampaku Takatsukasa Morohira was relieved of his duties; and he was replaced by Nijō Yoshimoto.
 1347 (Jōwa 3, 9th month): Nijō Yoshimoto was demoted from his high office as Kampaku; and he was instead given the title and responsibilities of sadaijin.
 1349 (Jōwa 5):— Go-Murakami flees to A'no; Ashikaga Tadayoshi and Kō no Moronao quarrel; Ashikaga Motouji, son of Takauji, appointed Kamakura Kanrei

Notes

References
 Ackroyd, Joyce. (1982) Lessons from History: The Tokushi Yoron. Brisbane: University of Queensland Press.  
 Mehl, Margaret. (1997). History and the State in Nineteenth-Century Japan. New York: St Martin's Press. ; OCLC 419870136
 Nussbaum, Louis Frédéric and Käthe Roth. (2005). Japan Encyclopedia. Cambridge: Harvard University Press. ; OCLC 48943301
 Thomas, Julia Adeney. (2001). Reconfiguring Modernity: Concepts of Nature in Japanese Political Ideology. Berkeley: University of California Press. ; 
 Titsingh, Isaac. (1834). Nihon Ōdai Ichiran; ou,  Annales des empereurs du Japon.  Paris: Royal Asiatic Society, Oriental Translation Fund of Great Britain and Ireland. OCLC 5850691

External links
 National Diet Library, "The Japanese Calendar" -- historical overview plus illustrative images from library's collection

Japanese eras
1340s in Japan
1350s in Japan